Amanda Lovelace is a bestselling American poet who rose to fame through her poetry posted to Tumblr and Instagram.  Her works have a feminist character, bringing new versions of traditional tales.  They have succinct and direct verses, although reflective. She is the author of the women are some kind of magic series, including the Goodreads Choice Award-winning the princess saves herself in this one and women are some kind of magic.

Personal life 
Lovelace graduated with a BA in English and a minor in sociology from Kean University in May 2017. In 2017, she also married fellow poet Parker Lee. She identifies as queer and is a practicing witch. She and Lee live in New Jersey with their three cats.

Works 
Lovelace initially self-published her first work, the princess saves herself in this one, with CreateSpace in 2016, but its success caught the attention of the traditional publishing industry.  The collection was ultimately picked up in 2017 by the American publisher Andrews McMeel, who published her subsequent works as well. the princess saves herself in this one is autobiographical and deals with her experiences growing up.

The third volume, the mermaid’s voice returns in this one was released in 2019, and was listed on American Booksellers Association's "Indie Poetry Bestseller List". the mermaid's voice returns in this one was less well received than the previous title and was criticized for feeling stretched out and underwhelming.

According to Lovelace, this series aims "to show the rich inner lives of women with a focus on our hidden everyday struggles." Many of Lovelace's works deal with topics such as sexual abuse, trauma, and healing. Although the witch doesn’t burn in this one "speaks so explicitly to our current moment," the volume was actually completed before the revival of the #MeToo movement.  Despite that, Lovelace notes that, "witch is still very much my #MeToo book. It will also not be the last one.”  She has listed Speak by Laurie Halse Anderson and The Handmaid's Tale as influences.

Author Deborah Harkness praised Lovelace's writing in a 2018 interview with Boston Globe. Lovelace has rejected the label Instapoet, as she originally began posting her work to Tumblr, and only began publishing her work on Instagram after her first works had been published in print. Lovelace views criticism of Instapoets as a form of snobbery, associating the term as a way to set them apart from "real poets."

Lovelace also wrote Things That H(a)unt duology. The first installment, to make monsters out of girls, came out in 2018. The text "explores the memory of being in an abusive relationship" and "poses the eternal question: Can you heal once you’ve been marked by a monster?"

Bibliography

women are some kind of magic
 the princess saves herself in this one (2016)
 the witch doesn't burn in this one (2018)
 the mermaid's voice returns in this one (2019)
 slay those dragons: a journal for writing your own story (2019)

the things that h(a)unt
 to make monsters out of girls (2018)
 to drink coffee with a ghost (2019)

you are your own fairy tale
 break your glass slippers (2020)
 shine your icy crown (2021)
 unlock your storybook heart (2022)

Standalone works
 flower crowns and fearsome things (2021)
 believe in your own magic: a 45-card oracle deck & guidebook (2020)

Anthologized works
 [Dis]Connected: Poems & Stories of Connection and Otherwise (2018), edited by Michelle Halket
 His Hideous Heart: Thirteen of Edgar Allan Poe's Most Unsettling Tales Reimagined (2019), edited by Dahlia Adler
 Body Talk: 37 Voices Explore Our Radical Anatomy (2020), edited by Kelly Jensen
 Every Body Shines: Sixteen Stories About Living Fabulously Fat (2021), edited by Cassandra Newbould

See also 
 Instapoetry

References

External links

Living people
American women poets
21st-century American poets
21st-century American women writers
Instagram poets
Kean University alumni
1991 births